The Mad River Complex Fire was a group of fires during the 2015 California wildfire season. The fires started on July 30, 2015 in Trinity County due to lightning strikes. It burned 73,137 acres. Some of the fuels involved were dry from the drought in the area, making them easier to burn. The River Complex Fire was part of this fire, making it a "complex" fire. It was contained on September 13, 2015.

References 

2015 California wildfires